Epicureanism is a system of philosophy developed by Epicurus ca. 300 BCE.

Epicurean or epicure may also refer to:

Epicure (gourmet), a person interested in food, sometimes with overtones of excessive refinement
The Epicurean, 1827 novel written by Thomas Moore
Epicurean paradox, an argument about the problem of reconciling evil with an omnipotent deity
Marius the Epicurean, 1885 philosophical novel written by Walter Pater

Music 
Epicurean (album), a compilation of early work by The Orchids, released by Sarah Records in 1992
Epicure (band), an Australian rock band
Épicure (opera), an 1800 opera

See also
Epicurious, a brand and web site dedicated to food and cooking
Epicurus (341 BC – 270 BC), ancient Greek philosopher